is a Japanese politician who served as Minister of Education, Culture, Sports, Science and Technology under Prime Minister Yasuo Fukuda from 2007 to 2008.

Education
Tokai, like Fukuda, attended Waseda University.

External links
 

1948 births
Living people
21st-century Japanese politicians
Culture ministers of Japan
Education ministers of Japan
Members of the House of Representatives (Japan)
Science ministers of Japan
Sports ministers of Japan
Technology ministers of Japan